Snap presidential elections held in Ukraine on 25 May 2014 resulted in Petro Poroshenko being elected President of Ukraine. Originally scheduled to take place on 29 March 2015, the date was changed following the 2014 Ukrainian revolution. Poroshenko won the elections with 54.7% of the votes, enough to win in a single round. His closest competitor, Yulia Tymoshenko,  emerged with 12.81% of the votes. The Central Election Commission reported voter turnout over 60%, excluding the regions not under government control. Since Poroshenko obtained an absolute majority in the first round, a run-off second ballot (on 15 June 2014) was unnecessary.

The election was not held everywhere in Ukraine. During the 2014 Crimean crisis, Ukraine lost control over Crimea, which was unilaterally annexed by Russia in March 2014. As a result, elections were not held in Crimea. Of the 2,430 planned ballot stations (in Donbas), only 426 remained open for polling. The self-proclaimed Donetsk People's Republic and Luhansk People's Republic, controlling large parts of Donbas, had vowed to do everything possible to disrupt the elections on their territory.

Petro Poroshenko won the presidency and served a full presidential term until 2019, losing to Volodymyr Zelensky.

Background

Prior to the rescheduling of the election
Initially the elections were scheduled for 29 March 2015.

On 7 December 2012, Fatherland nominated Yulia Tymoshenko as its presidential candidate. On 14 June 2013, the congress of her party approved the decision to nominate her as its candidate for the presidential election. On 11 October 2011, a Ukrainian court found Tymoshenko guilty of abuse of power, sentenced her to seven years in jail and banned her from seeking elected office for her period of imprisonment. Because Tymoshenko was in prison during the 2012 Ukrainian parliamentary election, Arseniy Yatsenyuk headed the election list of Fatherland. Tymoshenko remained in prison until 22 February 2014, after parliament voted for her release and removal of her criminal record, allowing her to compete for elected office once again.

In May 2013, Fatherland, UDAR, and Svoboda vowed to coordinate their actions during the presidential campaign, and promised "to support the candidate from among these parties who wins a place in the run-off election". If the election format were to change to a single round, the three parties vowed to agree on a single candidate.

On 24 October 2013, the leader of UDAR, Vitali Klitschko, announced he intended to take part in the election. Experts and lawyers argued that it is unclear if Klitschko could take part. Under Ukrainian law a presidential candidate must have had his residence in Ukraine for the past ten years prior to election day. Klitschko has lived for many years in both Ukraine and Germany, where, according to media reports, he has a residence permit. Klitschko confirmed on 28 February 2014 that he would take part in the 2014 Ukrainian presidential election. However, on 29 March, he withdrew from the race for the presidency, simultaneously pledging his support for Petro Poroshenko.

Former President Viktor Yanukovych, prior to his dismissal and subsequent flight from the country (see below), was considered likely to run for his second and final term. But, as of 19 December 2013, he had made no final decision on this. On 19 December 2013, Yanukovych alluded to not participating when he stated "If, theoretically speaking, my rating is low and has no prospects, I won't hinder the country's development and movement ahead".

Early 2014 elections

Scheduling
On 21 November 2013, the Ukrainian Second Azarov Government suspended preparations for signing an association agreement with the European Union. The decision to postpone the signing of the association agreement led to massive protests across Ukraine. These led to the removal of President Viktor Yanukovych and his government by the parliament in February, as part of the 2014 Ukrainian revolution, during which Yanukovych fled the country to Russia. On 22 February 2014, the Verkhovna Rada voted 328–0 to dismiss Yanukovych as president. Oleksandr Turchynov, deputy chairman of Fatherland, who had been appointed as Chairman of the Verkhovna Rada earlier that day, was named acting Prime Minister, and, due to Yanukovych's deposition, acting president, until new elections could be held.

In a press conference in the Russian city of Rostov-on-Don on 28 February, Yanukovych stated that he would not take part in the elections, stating that "I believe they are unlawful, and I will not take part in them". It was later speculated that Serhiy Tihipko would be the presidential candidate of the Party of Regions, Yanukovych's former party. The party's nomination went to Mykhailo Dobkin, however, and Tihipko entered the elections as an independent candidate. Dobkin was amongst the persons wanted by the (then new) Yatsenyuk Government to be sent for trial at the International Criminal Court.

During the 2014 Crimean crisis and Russian military intervention, Ukraine lost control over the Crimea, which was unilaterally annexed by Russia in March 2014. As a result, elections were not held in the Crimea, but Ukrainians who had kept their Ukrainian citizenship were allowed to vote elsewhere in Ukraine.

Escalation of pro-Russian unrest
In the Donbas region of the Eastern Ukraine, pro-Russian protests escalated into an armed separatist insurgency early in April 2014, when masked gunmen took control of several of the region's government buildings and towns.

On 15 April 2014, Ukrainian media reported that the General Prosecutor of Ukraine had launched criminal proceedings against then-candidate Oleh Tsarov for allegedly aiding separatists and thus violating Ukraine's territorial integrity. Tsarov withdrew his candidacy on 29 April.

Serhiy Taruta, governor of Donetsk, has suggested a referendum, to be held on 15 June, at the same time as the potential second round of the election. The referendum would address the decentralization of political power, potentially giving regions a greater say in their own affairs, such as greater control over the taxes they levy and the power to make Russian a second official language.

On 16 May 2014, the Constitutional Court of Ukraine ruled that the candidate elected as a result of the presidential election would serve a full five-year term of office.

On 17 May 2014, the Central Election Commission of Ukraine (CEC) stated that, due to "illegal actions of unknown people", it could not arrange for the "preparation and conduct of elections" in six constituencies in the Donetsk and Luhansk Oblasts. According to the CEC, members of district election commissions there had received threats to their own personal safety and to that of their families. The CEC warned that two million people in the two oblasts (provinces), about 5.6% of Ukraine's approximately 36 million eligible voters, could be deprived of their right to vote if the situation there did not improve. On 22 May, the work of eighteen of the thirty-four election commissions in Donetsk and Luhansk Oblasts had been stopped fully or partially by representatives of the self-proclaimed Donetsk People's Republic and Luhansk People's Republic. By 23 May, this number had increased to twenty of the thirty-four. The Committee of Voters of Ukraine predicted on 23 May that, due to  "ongoing acts of terrorism and armed insurgency", 10% of the Ukrainian population would be unable to vote. On the same day, the leader of the Luhansk People's Republic advised citizens not to go to the polls to vote, warning of possible provocative "explosions" set by Ukrainian military.

Simultaneous mayoral elections
On 25 May 2014, 27 mayoral elections were also held, including those in Odessa and 2014 Kyiv local election.

Russian reaction
Initially Russia opposed rescheduling the election because the Russian government considered the removal of then President Viktor Yanukovych illegal and his temporary successors an "illegitimate junta". But on 7 May 2014 Russian President Vladimir Putin stated the election would be a step "in the right direction" but that the vote would decide nothing unless the rights of "all citizens" were protected. At the St. Petersburg International Economic Forum on 23 May 2014, Putin appeared to further move away from Russia's initial position by announcing that Russia would respect the outcome of the elections in Ukraine and was ready to work with whoever won the presidency.

The US and European Union vowed early May 2014 that they would impose further sanctions against Russia (sanctions have been in place against Russia since the 2014 Crimean crisis) if it disrupted the election. However, unlike previous sanctions which were limited to individuals and companies, the third stage is set to target entire sectors of the Russian economy. Earlier the US and the EU had accused Russia of destabilising Ukraine by stoking the 2014 pro-Russian rebellion in Eastern Ukraine, a charge Russia has denied.

Electoral system
The term of office for the Ukrainian president is five years. If no candidate had obtained an absolute majority in the first round, then the two highest polling candidates would have contested a run-off second ballot on 15 June 2014.

Information technology framework for electoral monitoring – Elections 2014
Arsen Avakov underlined the importance of Elections 2014 a new IT elections monitoring system ("") that allowed voters to track the progress of the elections in real time, potentially increasing transparency, and avoiding the post-election disturbances seen in prior Ukrainian elections. On 22 May 2014, three days before the election, hacker group CyberBerkut announced that it had compromised the primary servers of the Central Election Commission and stolen passwords from the servers. As well, the Security Service of Ukraine investigated the servers and discovered malware that would have destroyed election results. On election day, authorities arrested a group of hackers with specialized equipment in Kyiv. They had been attempting to rig the election.

Candidates
21 candidates took part in the elections; seven of them had been nominated by political parties, 15 were self-nominees. A total of 18 candidates ran for president in 2010. Before 7 April 2014, four Party of Regions members were running for election, but on 7 April 2014 the political council of the party expelled the presidential candidates Serhiy Tihipko, Oleh Tsarov and Yuriy Boiko from the party. On 29 March a Party of Regions convention supported Mykhailo Dobkin's nomination as a presidential candidate.

Candidates were able to nominate themselves at the Central Election Commission of Ukraine from 25 February 2014 until 30 March 2014. The last date for registering candidates was 4 April 2014. Candidates needed to submit a full package of documents and a ₴2.5 million deposit.

Registered candidates
 Olha Bohomolets (independent) (supported by the Socialist Party of Ukraine)
 Yuriy Boyko (self-nominated)
 Mykhailo Dobkin (Party of Regions)
 Andriy Hrynenko (independent)
 Anatoliy Hrytsenko (Civil Position)
 Valeriy Konovalyuk (independent)
 Vasyl Kuybida (People's Movement of Ukraine)
 Renat Kuzmin (independent)
 Oleh Lyashko (Radical Party)
 Mykola Malomuzh (independent)
 Petro Poroshenko (independent) (supported by UDAR)
 Vadym Rabynovych (independent)
 Volodymyr Saranov (independent)
 Serhiy Tihipko (self-nominated) (supported by Strong Ukraine)
 Oleh Tyahnybok (Svoboda)
 Yulia Tymoshenko (Fatherland)
 Dmytro Yarosh (Right Sector, self-nominated)

Withdrawn candidates

Before deadline
 Natalia Korolevska (independent), withdrew from race on 1 May.
 Oleh Tsarov (self-nominated), withdrew from race on 29 April.

After deadline

 Zoryan Shkiryak (independent), withdrew from race on 10 May.
 Petro Symonenko (Communist Party of Ukraine), withdrew from race on 16 May.
 Oleksandr Klymenko (Ukrainian People's Party), withdrew his candidacy on May 18 "to support Petro Poroshenko as the sole representative of the national democratic forces".
 Vasyl Tsushko (independent), withdrew from race on 22 May.

The Central Election Commission was unable to remove from the ballot the names of candidates who withdrew from the race after the deadline of 1 May 2014.

Rejected candidates
The Central Election Commission rejected some applications for candidate registration early in the process. It refused to register O. Burnashova, V. Marynych, A. Makhlai, A. Kucheryavenko, V. Chopei, L. Rozhnova, L. Maksymenko, D. Myroshnychenko, P. Rekal, T. Onopriyuk, and Z. Abbasov. On 3 April 2014 the CEC rejected a further three candidates: a man named Darth Vader, Evhen Terekhov, and Yuriy Ivanitsky.

On 29 March 2014, Vitali Klitschko (UDAR) endorsed Petro Poroshenko, and announced he would run for Mayor of Kyiv in the local election taking place alongside the presidential election.

Opinion polls

International observers
The Central Election Commission of Ukraine (CEC) had registered 543 international official observers on 2 May 2014. On 23 May (two days before the election) this number had risen to 3,607 (CEC had completed the registration of observers on 19 May but on 23 May had allowed 823 members of the observer organization European Platform for Democratic Elections). Among others OSCE's Office for Democratic Institutions and Human Rights, OSCE's Parliamentary Assembly, the Ukrainian World Congress and the United States sent observers. OSCE deployed 100 long-term observers and 900 short-term observers. On 9 May 2014 U.S. Assistant Secretary for European and Eurasian Affairs Victoria Nuland stated her country would support 255 long-term and more than 3,300 short-term observers. Russia did not send observers. Other Commonwealth of Independent States members also did not send observers; because Ukraine had not sent an invitation to the CIS Election Monitoring Organisation.

Results

Petro Poroshenko won the elections with 54.7% of the votes. His closest competitor was Yulia Tymoshenko, who emerged with 12.81% of the votes. The Central Election Commission reported voter turnout at over 60% excluding those regions not under government control. In the Donbas region of Ukraine only 20% of the ballot stations were open due to threats and violence by pro-Russia separatists. Of the 2,430 planned ballot stations (in Donbas) only 426 remained open for polling.

Exit polls had also predicted that Poroshenko won the election outright with over 55.9% of the votes,

Reactions
Despite Russia's earlier protest at rescheduling the election and the general tense relation between the countries at the time because of the annexation of Crimea and the Russian military intervention in Ukraine, Russian President Vladimir Putin recognised the vote.

The leaders of the self-proclaimed Donetsk People's Republic and Luhansk People's Republic, controlling large parts of the Donbas region of Eastern Ukraine, declared that the regions had made their choice shown in the results of the status referendum of 11 May.

US President Barack Obama congratulated Petro Poroshenko with his victory by telephone 2 days after the election. This was also done by President of the European Commission José Manuel Barroso and European Parliament President Martin Schulz and other EU leaders such as German Chancellor Angela Merkel and French President François Hollande.

See also
2014 Ukrainian parliamentary election

Notes

References

External links

 

Presidential
Presidential elections in Ukraine
May 2014 events in Ukraine
2014 pro-Russian unrest in Ukraine
Euromaidan
Petro Poroshenko
Yulia Tymoshenko